Martha Namundjebo can refer to:

 Martha Namundjebo-Tilahun, Namibian business magnate, born Martha Namundjebo
 Lady May (Namibian singer), real name Martha Namundjebo